Horgen Oberdorf railway station is a railway station in Switzerland, situated in the town of Horgen. The station is located on the Thalwil–Arth-Goldau railway and is served by the S24 line of the Zürich S-Bahn.

Horgen station should not be confused with the nearby, but lower level, Horgen railway station, which is on the Lake Zürich left bank railway line.

Services 
 the following services stop at Horgen Oberdorf:

References

External links 
 
 

Railway stations in the canton of Zürich
Swiss Federal Railways stations
Horgen